Karoda is a gram panchayat of Behror Tehsil. Karoda situated on State Highway No-14, Near By Barrod Village.

The village have approximately 4100 population in 2011 census. Literacy is approximately 80%.

Geography
Sabi river is the famous river which cross village from two sites this. A large bridge is situated on Sabi River, from west bank to east bank across the river.

Karoda is a small industrial place. There are two international beer/ Beverages  factories.
Global Wine & Spirits Pvt.Ltd.
Pernod Ricard India Pvt. Ltd.

Demographics
Karoda village is situated on the bank of Sabi river. Here people of near by villages come for picnic. Baba Thadesar Tempel is the famous and 450-year-old temple. Baba Raj Nath singh is the Head of Hanuman Temple.

Near By Village
 Barrod
 Sodawas
 Nalpurr
 Ajmeripur

Alwar district
Cities and towns in Alwar district